Stráňavy is a village and municipality in Žilina District in the Žilina Region of northern Slovakia. It lies below the mountain Polom.

History
In historical records the village was first mentioned in 1356. The coat-of-arms and the seal picture a bird feeding in a meadow.

Since 1598, the village has grown from 22 houses to 430 houses and counts presently 1,838 inhabitants. Stranavy has a well-developed social and technical infrastructure and pays much attention to tourism. There is a thermal bath (24-26 °C), accommodation and food facilities.

Web Pages
http://www.stranavy.sk, only in Slovak

Geography
The municipality lies at an elevation of 420 metres and covers an area of 10.872 km². It has a population of about 1,838.

External links
http://www.statistics.sk/mosmis/eng/run.html

Villages and municipalities in Žilina District